Mary Eilene Janssen (born May 25, 1938) is an American retired film and television actress.

Early life
Eilene Janssen was born in Los Angeles, California on May 25, 1938, to Henry Janssen and Mary Ellen Thompson.

Film career
Janssen began her film career as a child actress in the early 1940s. With her father being a longtime worker for Universal Studios, Eilene Janssen made her first screen appearance in the 1940 film Sandy Gets Her Man. She continued to have bit parts in several movies such as Two Girls and a Sailor and It Happened Tomorrow. In 1944, she was awarded the title "Little Miss America".

As Janssen grew older, she gained more prominent roles such as Elise in Song of Love and Peggy in The Boy with Green Hair. She and Michael Chapin were the juvenile leads in four Westerns between 1951 and 1952, all of which were directed by Philip Ford. She played Judy Dawson. As a young adult she was the female lead in the 1957 Western film Escape from Red Rock.

Apart from films, Janssen also acted in television series including The Gene Autry Show,The Adventures of Ozzie and Harriet, Father Knows Best, Mister Ed, The George Burns and Gracie Allen Show, Tales of Wells Fargo, Make Room for Daddy, The Many Loves of Dobie Gillis, The Beverly Hillbillies and Perry Mason.

Janssen retired from acting in 1968. As of 2004, she is residing in Pasadena, California.

Personal life
Janssen married Harry Ronald Rothschild on November 29, 1957. They had two children together before they divorced in 1962. She then married Thomas Alexander Orchard, in 1963. They had one child together before their 1966 divorce. Janssen married George Ellis Moore in 1968. They had two children together before he died in 2000.

Filmography

References

Bibliography

External links
 

1938 births
Living people
American child actresses
American film actresses
American television actresses
21st-century American women